Something White and Sigmund is the second extended play by Australian indie rock band, Andromeda, released in July 2003 on Shock Records. It peaked at number 10 on the ARIA Hitseekers Singles Chart. Soon after the group expand their name to Love Outside Andromeda, to avoid confusion with other bands, and re-released the EP under their new name.

Track listing

All tracks written by Sianna Naji; arrangements by Andromeda.

 "Something White and Sigmund" – 4:03
 "Mercury 2 Degrees" – 4:42
 "Raido" – 4:29
 "Third Dimension Colour Scene" – 3:03
 "Starseeds" – 4:01

Instruments 
 Sianna Lee - Vocals, guitar and keyboard
 Jamie Slocombe - Guitar and vocals
 Jesse Lee - Bass
 Joe Hammond - Drums, percussion and backing vocals
 Tihm Harvey - Keyboard on track 2, guitar on track 5
 Raph Hammond - Trumpet on track 3

References

External links

Love Outside Andromeda | Releases

2002 EPs
Love Outside Andromeda albums